Sacred Heart Church, Watlington Street, Reading, is a Catholic church also known as the Polish Church.

The church was designed by W. Allen Dixon in 1872–75 and was originally an Anglican church known as the Church of St John the Evangelist. After it became disused it was taken up by the Polish community in Reading and is now a Catholic church. The building is grade II listed with Historic England.

References

External links

Buildings designed by W. Allen Dixon
Grade II listed churches in Berkshire
Grade II listed Roman Catholic churches in England
Roman Catholic churches completed in 1875
Sacred Heart
19th-century Roman Catholic church buildings in the United Kingdom